Dunham is an unincorporated community and coal town in Letcher County, Kentucky, United States. Dunham's post office  operated in the community from 1913 to 1960.

The community was named for county auditor A. S. Dunham. The community contains two churches, a concrete supplier, and some scattered houses throughout the area. The community is governed by the nearby City of Jenkins, and sits roughly 5 minutes away from the Kentucky-Virginia border.

References

Unincorporated communities in Letcher County, Kentucky
Unincorporated communities in Kentucky
Coal towns in Kentucky